Joseph Kuhn may refer to:

 Joseph E. Kuhn (1864–1935), U.S. Army officer
 Joseph Francis Kuhn (1924–1962), American composer, arranger and conductor

See also 
Joseph Kuhn-Régnier (1873–1940), French illustrator
Joseph Henry Kuhns (1800–1883), Whig member of the U.S. House of Representatives